Leet Hill, Kirby Cane is a  geological Site of Special Scientific Interest in Kirby Cane in Norfolk. It is a Geological Conservation Review site.

This is a quarry which has a sequence of deposits dating to the Middle Pleistocene, with the base of gravels laid down by a confluence to two rivers, above that glacial gravels, and then a sequence of chalky sands probably also laid down by glaciers.

The site is a working quarry and there is no public access.

References

Sites of Special Scientific Interest in Norfolk
Geological Conservation Review sites